Virginia's 83rd House of Delegates district elects one of 100 seats in the Virginia House of Delegates, the lower house of the state's bicameral legislature. District 83 includes parts of the cities of Norfolk and Virginia Beach. The district is currently represented by Republican Tim Anderson.

District officeholders

References

External links
 

Norfolk, Virginia
Virginia Beach, Virginia
Virginia House of Delegates districts